Arnan Capulong Panaligan (born January 21, 1962) is a Filipino lawyer and politician. He has served as the representative for Oriental Mindoro's 1st congressional district since 2022 as part of the local Mindoro Bago Sarili party. He had previously served as the Mayor of Calapan from 2013 to 2022, having previously been mayor from 1995 to 2004. He was also the Governor of Oriental Mindoro from 2004 to 2010.

Early career 
Panaligan was born in Calapan, Oriental Mindoro on January 21, 1962, to Leandro and Araceli Panaligan. He studied at Holy Infant Academy before attending Ateneo De Manila University where he studied law. He also studied at Divine Word College of Calapan.

After qualifying for the bar in 1987, Panaligan worked as a legal researcher at the Supreme Court, as well as a technical assistant at the House of Representatives Electoral Tribunal (HRET).

Political career

Local Politics 
Panaligan's political career began when he was elected Mayor of Calapan in 1995.

Under his tenure, Calapan underwent major transformations. Panaligan oversaw various infrastructure enhancements, including the development of concrete roads and schools in rural areas. He also issued health insurance programmes to low-income houses. He also successfully attracted external investors to the city.

In 2004, Panaligan ran for vice governor of Oriental Mindoro as the running mate of the then-incumbent governor Bartolome Marasigan. The ticket would win the election, with Panaligan being sworn in on June 30, 2004.

Following the death of Marasigan on December 1, 2004, Panaligan succeeded Marasigan as governor. Panaligan would be re-elected in 2007 and would be ultimately be succeeded by Alfonso Umali Jr. in 2010.

In 2013, Panaligan ran for the Calapan mayoralty under the banner of the United Nationalist Alliance (UNA). He defeated the Liberal candidate Jojo Perez, marking his return to the mayoralty.  He ran and won unopposed under PDP-Laban in 2019.

Congressional Career 
In 2022, Panaligan ran for representative in Oriental Mindoro's 1st congressional district to replace outgoing representative Paulino Salvador Leachon, who was term-limited and was running for governor. Running under the Mindoro Bago Sarili banner, Panaligan would defeat PDP-Laban's Mark Marcos and independent Eduardo Alvaro.

References

External links 
 Arnan Panaligan on Facebook

1962 births
Living people
Lakas–CMD politicians
Members of the House of Representatives of the Philippines from Oriental Mindoro
Governors of Oriental Mindoro
Mayors of places in Oriental Mindoro